Patrick Armand is a French retired ballet dancer, and the director of the San Francisco Ballet School since 2017.

Early life 
Armand was born in Marseille, France, where he studied at the Ecole de Danse de Marseille. In 1980, he won the Prix de Lausanne.

In 1981, he joined the Ballet Théâtre Français, rising to principal dancer in 1983. The same year he was nominated for a Laurence Olivier award for his performance of Bejart's songs of a wayfarer which he performed with Rudolf Noureev From 1984 to 1990, he was with English National Ballet as a principal dancer, and then joined Boston Ballet.

Armand has been a jury member of the Prix de Lausanne on several occasions since 1998. He served as ballet master and also as a faculty member at Teatro all Scala in Milan until 2010. It was at this point that he took over as the Principal of the San Francisco Ballet School Trainee program.

From 2012 to 2017, Armand was associate director of the San Francisco Ballet School, when he succeeded Lola de Avila, becoming director in 2017.

References

Living people
French male ballet dancers
English National Ballet principal dancers
Year of birth missing (living people)
San Francisco Ballet dancers
Entertainers from Marseille
Prix de Lausanne winners
Boston Ballet dancers
People from Marseille